Meroux-Moval (pronounced as Méroux-Moval) is a commune in the Territoire de Belfort department in Bourgogne-Franche-Comté in northeastern France. It was established on 1 January 2019 from the merging of both Meroux and Moval. Belfort – Montbéliard TGV station is situated in the commune.

Population

See also

Communes of the Territoire de Belfort department

References

Communes of the Territoire de Belfort
States and territories established in 2019
Populated places established in 2019
2019 establishments in France